Dave Cuasito (born July 6, 1972), better known by his stage name D-Styles, is a hip hop producer and DJ. He has been a member of Invisibl Skratch Piklz, Beat Junkies, and Third Sight. He has also been a resident DJ of Low End Theory.  D-styles is an instructor at the Beat Junkies Institute of Sound.

In 2002, D-Styles released his solo studio album, Phantazmagorea, on Beat Junkie Sound. It was described by Fact as "the perfect evolution of hip hop's sample addiction: an album made entirely of samples manipulated by the human hand and overseen by a human brain."

Discography

Studio albums
 Phantazmagorea (2002)
 Noises in The Right Order (2019)
 545  (d-styles,excess,Mike boo,Pryvet peepsho) (2020)

EPs
 Sound Advice (2003) 
 545 (2019)

Mixtapes
 Hot Sauce in the Dick Hole (1997) 
 Stylus Wars (1997) with A-Trak

Singles
 "Return to Planetary Deterioration" b/w "Clifford's Mustache" (2001)
 "Felonius Funk" (2002)
 "John Wayne on Acid" (2003)
 "Beautiful Fog" b/w "Millions of Locusts Swarming" (2007)

Guest appearances
 Rob Swift - "Salsa Scratch" from Sound Event (2002)
 Busdriver - Temporary Forever (2002)
 Busdriver - Cosmic Cleavage (2004)
 Buck 65 - "Rough House Blues", "Surrender to Strangeness", "The Floor", and "Blanc-Bec" from Secret House Against the World (2005)
 Birdy Nam Nam - "Il y a un cauchemar dans mon placard" from Birdy Nam Nam (2005)
 Edit - "Crunk de Gaulle" from Certified Air Raid Material (2007)
 Buck 65 - Dirtbike (2008)
 Themselves - "The Mark" from Crowns Down (2009)
 Nocando - "DSD2" from Jimmy the Lock (2010)
 DJ Kentaro - "Crossfader" from Contrast (2012)
 Jonwayne - "You Can Love Me When I'm Dead" from Rap Album One (2013)
 Bambu - "Last Year" from Sun of a Gun (2013)
 Jesse Medina - "In the Moment" from Meet Jesse Medina (2014)
 Kraddy - "The Prestige" from Be a Light (2014)
 Jonwayne - "TED Talk" from Rap Album Two (2017)
 BeatBombers - “BeatBombers LP” (2017)

Productions
 Roc Raida - "Razorblade Alcohol Slide" from Crossfaderz (2000)
 Roc Raida - "The Murder Faktory" from Champion Sounds (2003)
 Busdriver - "Avantcore (D-Styles Remix)" from Fear of a Black Tangent (2005)
 Bambu - "Last Year" from Sun of a Gun (2013)
 Scuba Chicken - "Alyssa Milano" and "Pumpin' Gas" from Ode to Malyssa Ilano (2021)

Filmography

Film
 Wave Twisters (2001)

References

External links
 
Dj D-Styles Interview NAMM Oral History Library (2020)

1972 births
Living people
Hip hop record producers
Filipino hip hop DJs